Ville Vainikainen (born January 26, 1994) is a Finnish professional ice hockey player. He is currently playing for SaiPa of the Finnish Liiga.

Vainikainen made his Liiga debut playing with SaiPa during the 2014-15 Liiga season.

References

External links

1994 births
Living people
KooKoo players
SaiPa players
Peliitat Heinola players
Finnish ice hockey forwards
People from Kuopio
Sportspeople from North Savo